The city of Vancouver, Canada, held municipal elections on November 20, 1999. Canadian citizens who were over 18 years of age at the time of the vote, and had been a resident of Vancouver for the previous 30 days and a resident of B.C. for the previous six months, were able to vote for candidates in four races that were presented on one ballot.

Overall, 97 candidates filed for election, but two dropped out. There were 95 candidates at election time. There were 256,361 registered voters, and 94,271 votes cast for a voter turnout of 36.77 per cent.

The ballot elected one mayor, 10 councillors, nine school board trustees and seven park board commissioners. Each elector could vote for as many candidates as there were open seats (e.g., an elector could vote for ten or fewer councillors). Two borrowing questions were on the ballot, and both passed by a margin of 70 per cent or more.

In an effort to prevent a repeat of the 1996 election that saw many joke candidates register because there was no nomination filing fee, city council adopted a bylaw on Sept. 15,1999 requiring candidates to pay a nominal $100 fee. The bylaw had the intended effect, but at least two people, going by the names "T. Raax" and "Dr. Evil", did put up the fees and consequently ran as mayoral candidates.

The Green Party and the Coalition of Progressive Electors mounted a combined slate of candidates but ran a single mayoral candidate.

Elections to Vancouver City Council

Overall council results
All figures include votes cast for both mayor and councillors but not school and park board.
* Denotes incumbent.

Mayoralty election
One to be elected.

Councillors election
Ten to be elected.

Elections to the Vancouver Parks Board

Seven to be elected.

Election to the Vancouver School Board

Ten to be elected.

References

External links
 City of Vancouver, Unofficial Results 
 City of Vancouver, Official Results
 City of Vancouver Election Results - 1999 by category
 City of Vancouver Statement, Nomination Deposit Required For All Candidates 
 Vancouver charter 
 Vancouver School Board (School District #39) 
 Vancouver Board of Parks and Recreation

1999 elections in Canada
Municipal elections in Vancouver